The Rimland is a concept championed by Nicholas John Spykman, professor of international relations at Yale University. To him geopolitics is the planning of the security policy of a country in terms of its geographical factors. He described the maritime fringe of a country or continent; in particular the densely populated western, southern, and eastern edges of the Eurasian continent.

He criticized Mackinder for overrating the Heartland as being of immense strategic importance due to its vast size, central geographical location and supremacy of land power rather than sea power. He assumed that the Heartland will not be a potential hub of Europe, because:

 Western Russia was then an agrarian society
 Bases of industrialization were found to the west of the Ural mountains.
 This area is ringed to the north, east, south, and south-west by some of the greater obstacles to transportation (ice and freezing temperature, lowering mountains etc.).
 There has never really been a simple land power–sea power opposition.

Spykman thought that the Rimland, the strip of coastal land that encircles Eurasia, is more important than the central Asian zone (the so-called Heartland) for the control of the Eurasian continent. Spykman's vision is at the base of the "containment politics" put into effect by the United States in its relation/position to the Soviet Union during the post-World War II period.

Thus, 'Heartland' appeared to him to be less important in comparison to 'Rimland.'

Concept
According to Spykman, "Who controls the Rimland rules Eurasia, who rules Eurasia controls the destinies of the world."

The Rimland, Halford Mackinder's "Inner or Marginal Crescent", was divided into three sections:
 The European coast land;
 The Arabian-Middle Eastern desert land; and,
 The Asiatic monsoon land.
Rimland or inner crescent contains most of world's people as well as large share of world's resources. Rimland is in between Heartland and marginal seas, so it was more important than Heartland. It included Asia minor, Arabia, Iran, Afghanistan, South East Asia, China, Korea and East Siberia except Russia.

All the aforesaid countries lie in the buffer zone that is between sea power and land power.

Rimland countries were amphibian states, surrounding the Eurasian continents.

While Spykman accepts the first two as defined, he rejects the simple grouping of the Asian countries into one "monsoon land." India, the Indian Ocean littoral, and Indian culture were geographically and civilizationally separate from the Chinese lands.

The Rimland's defining characteristic is that it is an intermediate region, lying between the heartland and the marginal sea powers.  As the amphibious buffer zone between the land powers and sea powers, it must defend itself from both sides, and therein lies its fundamental security problems. Spykman's conception of the Rimland bears greater resemblance to Alfred Thayer Mahan's "debated and debatable zone" than to Mackinder's inner or marginal crescent.

The Rimland has great importance coming from its demographic weight, natural resources, and industrial development. Spykman sees this importance as the reason that the Rimland will be crucial to containing the Heartland (whereas Mackinder had believed that the Outer or Insular Crescent would be the most important factor in the Heartland's containment).

Applicability and variations
Spykman called for the consolidation of the Rimland countries to ensure their survival during World War II. With the defeat of Germany and the emergence of the USSR, Spykman's views were embraced during the formulation of the Cold War American policy of containing communist influence.

But as the states within the Rimland had varying degree of independence, and a variety of races, and culture, it did not come under the control of any single power.

Dr Spyros Katsoulas introduces the concept of the Rimland Bridge to describe the hinge between Europe and Asia, where Greece, Cyprus, and Turkey are located. The purpose of the new term is not to contradict, but rather to supplement Spykman's theory, and highlight the special strategic significance of the Eastern Mediterranean, as well as its inherent instability.

The Rimland Bridge is defined as the buffer and transit zone that connects the European and Asian parts of Rimland and has three major characteristics. It simultaneously acts as a strategic chokepoint and a valuable gateway, but also as a dangerous shatter belt (geopolitics) due to the enduring Greek–Turkish rivalry.

Criticism
 It was a self-fulfilling prophecy. 
 In his concept of air power he did not include the use of modern missiles with nuclear war heads.
 The Rimland is not a region but a unit, otherwise the epitome of geographical diversity.
 The Rimland-Theory is biased against Asian countries.
 The Rimland-Theory does not take into account the various conflicts going on between its different countries (India vs. Pakistan, etc.)

See also
 Theory of Heartland
 Core–periphery
 Island chain strategy

Further reading

References

Political terminology of the United States
Geopolitics